Pawcatuck is a census-designated place in Connecticut.

Pawcatuck may also refer to:
USS Pawcatuck (AO-108), fleet replenishment oiler

See also
 Pawcatuck River, in Connecticut and Rhode Island